Patrick O’Connell (29 January 1934 – 10 August 2017) was an Irish actor. O'Connell began his acting career appearing in various films, such as the Brian Keith war "The McKenzie Break" (1970), "Cromwell" (1970), and the Simon Rouse drama "The Ragman's Daughter" (1972). He also appeared in "The Human Factor" (1980) with Nicol Williamson, the drama "Runners" (1983) with Kate Hardie, and the horror feature "Dream Demon" (1988) with Kathleen Wilhoite. His film career continued throughout the eighties and the nineties in productions like the drama "Nanou" (1988) with Imogen Stubbs and "Don't Get Me Started" (1993). He also appeared in the TV special "Fool's Fire" (PBS, 1991–92). He also worked in television during these years, including a part on "Life Goes On" (ABC, 1989-1993). O'Connell most recently acted on "Baskets" (FX, 2015-). He was also an artist known for his paintings, drawings, linocuts, and etchings.

Early life 
Patrick O'Connell was Irish but was brought up in Birmingham, England, and after attending Birmingham Theatre School, he won a scholarship to train at Royal Academy of Dramatic Art (RADA).

Theatre 
His theatre work included: Stan Man in Arnold Wesker's Roots at the Belgrade, Coventry, the Royal Court and the Duke of York's (1959), Camille Desmoulins in Poor Bitos at the Duke of York's with Donald Pleasence (1963), created the role of Gunner O'Rouke in John McGrath's Events While Guarding the Bofors Gun at Hampstead Theatre (1966), US (an experimental play about the Vietnam War) with the RSC, directed by Peter Brook at the Aldwych (1966), Macduff to Paul Scofield's Macbeth directed by Peter Hall with the RSC, at Stratford and the Aldwych (1967), Kent in King Lear at the Young Vic (1981), McLeavy in Joe Orton's Loot with Leonard Rossiter at the Ambassador's and the Lyric, directed by Jonathan Lynn (March 1984 - Jan '85), and Henry IV in The Henrys with the ESC at  The Old Vic, directed by Michael Bogdanov (1986).

Television 
His television work included Derek in the factory-set "Lena, O my Lena" by Alun Owen for Armchair Theatre directed by Ted Kotcheff (1960), Ashton in Doctor Who (The End of Tomorrow) directed by Richard Martin (1964), Nobby in The Coming Out Party (the Wednesday play) (1965), Guido in The Big Spender (1965–66), Dr. Lassiter / Willy / Nobby Clark in Dixon of Dock Green (1966 / 68 / 72), Rogers in The Saint (1967), Colour Sgt. O'Brien in the Thames TV series Frontier (1968), D.I Gamble in ATV's Fraud Squad (1968–70), Mick in Sling Your Hook (the Wednesday play) (1969), Martin Stewart in The Patriot Game by Dominic Behan, Thames TV directed by Piers Haggard (1969), Mallory in Callan (1970), O'Neill in Elizabeth R (1971), Ryder in The Persuaders (1971), Reagan in the Protectors (1972),  Edward Hammond in BBC TV series, The Brothers (1972–77), Manton in The Professionals (1980), Dan Glover in Enemy at the Door (1980), Jack Blair in LWT's 13 episode series of We'll Meet Again (1982), Brian Wilkinson in Yes, Minister (1982), Jack Vaizey in Inspector Morse (1993), Harry Hopwood in The Bill (1989 / 91), Gerard in Peak Practice (1993), James White in Casualty (1994), and John Callard in Dangerfield (1995).

Filmography
Cromwell (1970) - John Lilburne
The McKenzie Break (1970) - Sgt. Maj. Cox
The Ragman's Daughter (1972) - Tony, 35 yrs (written by Alan Silitoe)
The Human Factor (1979) - Reader
Spaghetti House (1982) - Mallory
Runners (1983) - The Hostel - Warden
The Shooting Party (1985) - Charlie Lyne
Nanou (1986) - Nanou's father

References

External links

Patrick O'Connell at TCM

Irish male film actors
Irish male stage actors
Irish male television actors
Male actors from Dublin (city)
1934 births
2017 deaths